Lisletown is an extinct town in Osage County, in the U.S. state of Missouri. 

Variant names were "Lisle" and "Mariosa Delta". A post office called Lisle was established in 1842, and remained in operation until 1860. The community was named after Benjamin Lisle, a first settler. As of 2016, Mari Osa Delta Campground occupies the site.

References

Ghost towns in Missouri
Former populated places in Osage County, Missouri